John David Guillory (born 1952) is an American literary critic best known for his book Cultural Capital (1993). He is the Julius Silver Professor of English at New York University.

Life
Guillory "grew up in New Orleans in a working-class Catholic family, and attended Jesuit schools." Guillory gained his BA at Tulane University, and a PhD in English from Yale University in 1979. His PhD, Poetry and Authority: Spenser, Milton, and Literary History, was subsequently published as a monograph. Guillory taught at Yale University (1979–89), Johns Hopkins University (1989–97), and Harvard University (1997–99) before moving to New York University in 1999.

Guillory's book Cultural Capital (1993) argued that "the category of 'literature' names the cultural capital of the old bourgeoisie, a form of capital increasingly marginal to the social function of the present educational system". After an opening chapter on the debate over the literary canon, Cultural Capital took up several 'case studies': Thomas Gray's Elegy Written in a Country Churchyard, the close reading of New Criticism, and literary theory after Paul De Man.  Guillory viewed the rigour of 'Theory' as an attempt by literary scholars to reclaim its cultural capital from a newly ascendant technical professional class. Its unconscious aim was "to model the intellectual work of the theorist on the new social form of intellectual work, the technobureaucratic labour of the new professional-managerial class." A final chapter gave a history of the concept of value from Adam Smith to Barbara Herrnstein Smith.

Awards and Honors 
1992: Best American Essays for "Canon, Syllabus, List"

1994: René Wellek Prize from the American Comparative Literature Association for Cultural Capital, "an uncompromising study of the problem of canon formation itself and what that problem tells us about the crisis in contemporary education."

1997: Class of 1932 Fellow of the Council of the Humanities, Princeton University

2001: Tanner Lectures on Human Values at UC Berkeley, respondent to Sir Frank Kermode 

2016: Francis Andrew March Award from the Association of Departments of English for "Distinguished Service to the Profession of English Studies." 

2016: Golden Dozen Award for teaching, New York University

Books
 Poetic Authority: Spenser, Milton, and Literary History. Columbia University Press, 1983.
 Cultural Capital: The Problem of Literary Canon Formation. University of Chicago Press, 1993.
 (ed. with Judith Butler and Kendall Thomas) What's left of theory?: new work on the politics of literary theory. Routledge, 2000.
 Professing Criticism: Essays on the Organization of Literary Study. University of Chicago Press, 2022.

References

1952 births
Living people
American literary critics
Sociologists of art
Tulane University alumni
Yale University alumni
Harvard University faculty
Johns Hopkins University faculty
New York University faculty